Ricardo Cabot Boix (12 January 1917 – 18 August 2014) was a Spanish field hockey player who competed in the 1948 Summer Olympics. He was a member of the Spanish field hockey team, which was eliminated in the group stage. He played one match as defender in the tournament.

External links
 
profile 
Ricardo Cabot Boix's obituary 

1917 births
2014 deaths
Spanish male field hockey players
Olympic field hockey players of Spain
Field hockey players at the 1948 Summer Olympics
Field hockey players from Barcelona